Nord (officially ; ;) is a département in Hauts-de-France region, France bordering Belgium. It was created from the western halves of the historical counties of Flanders and Hainaut, and the Bishopric of Cambrai. The modern coat of arms was inherited from the County of Flanders.

Nord is the country's most populous département. It had a population of 2,608,346 in 2019. It also contains the metropolitan region of Lille (the main city and the prefecture of the département), the fourth-largest urban area in France after Paris, Lyon and Marseille. The department is the part of France where the French Flemish dialect of Dutch has historically been spoken as a native language. Similarly, the distinct French Picard dialect Ch'ti is spoken there.

History 
Tribes of the Belgae, such as the Menapii and Nervii were the first peoples recorded in the area later known as Nord.

During the 4th and 5th Centuries, Roman rulers of Gallia Belgica secured the route from the major port of Bononia (Boulogne) to Colonia (Cologne), by co-opting Germanic peoples north-east of this corridor, such as the Tungri. In effect, the area known later as Nord became an isogloss (linguistic border) between the Germanic and Romance languages. Saxon colonisation of the region from the 5th to the 8th centuries likely shifted the isogloss further south so that, by the 9th century, most people immediately north of Lille spoke a dialect of Old Dutch. This has remained evident in the place names of the region.  After the County of Flanders became part of France in the 9th century, the isogloss moved north and east.

During the 14th century, much of the area came under the control of the Duchy of Burgundy and in subsequent centuries was therefore part of the Habsburg Netherlands (from 1482) and the Spanish Netherlands (1581).

Areas that later constituted Nord were ceded to France by treaties in 1659, 1668, and 1678, becoming the Counties of Flanders and Hainaut, and part of the Bishopric of Cambrai.

On 4 March 1790, during the French Revolution, Nord became one of the original 83 departments created to replace the counties.

Modern government policies making French the only official language have led to a decline in use of the Dutch West Flemish dialect. There are currently 20,000 speakers of a sub-dialect of West Flemish in the arrondissement of Dunkirk and it appears likely that this particular sub-dialect will be extinct within decades.

Geography 

Nord is part of the current Hauts-de-France region and is surrounded by the French departments of Pas-de-Calais, Somme, and Aisne, as well as by Belgium and the North Sea. It is the longest department in metropolitan France, measuring 184 km from Fort-Philippe in the north-west to Anor in the south-east.

Situated in the north of the country along the western half of the Belgian frontier, the department is unusually long and narrow. The principal rivers are the following: Yser, Lys, Escaut, Scarpe, Sambre.

Principal towns

The most populous commune is Lille, the prefecture. With nearby Roubaix, Tourcoing and Villeneuve-d'Ascq, it constitutes the center of a cluster of industrial and former mining towns totalling slightly over a million inhabitants. As of 2019, there are 10 communes with more than 30,000 inhabitants:

Demographics 

With a population of 2,608,346 in 2019, Nord is the department with the largest population, being approximately equal to that of Albania.

Politics

The President of the Departmental Council is the unaffiliated right-winger Christian Poiret.

The first President of the Fifth Republic, General Charles de Gaulle, was born in Lille in the department on 22 November 1890.

Presidential elections second round

Current National Assembly Representatives

Economy 

At the forefront of France's 19th century industrialisation, the area suffered severely during World War I and now faces the economic, social and environmental problems associated with the decline of coal mining with its neighbours following the earlier decline of the Lille-Roubaix textile industry.

Until recently, the department was dominated economically by coal mining, which extended through the heart of the department from neighbouring Artois into central Belgium.

Tourism

See also
Cantons of the Nord department
Communes of the Nord department
Arrondissements of the Nord department (France)
French Flemish
Université Lille Nord de France

References

External links

  Prefecture website
  Departmental Council website
  

 
1790 establishments in France
Departments of Hauts-de-France
States and territories established in 1790